The 2010 Kilkenny Intermediate Hurling Championship was the 46th staging of the Kilkenny Intermediate Hurling Championship since its establishment by the Kilkenny County Board in 1929. The championship began on 18 September 2010 and ended on 17 October 2011.

The final was played on 17 October 2010 at Nowlan Park in Kilkenny, between Dicksboro and Mullinavat, in what was their first meeting in a final. Dicksboro won the match by 2–12 to 2–11 to claim their third championship title overall and a first title since 2005.

Team changes

To Championship

Promoted from the Kilkenny Junior Hurling Championship
 Blacks and Whites

Relegated from the Kilkenny Senior Hurling Championship
 Young Irelands

From Championship

Promoted to the Kilkenny Senior Hurling Championship
 St. Lachtain's

Relegated to the Kilkenny Junior Hurling Championship
 Thomastown

Results

First round

Relegation playoff

Quarter-finals

Semi-final

Final

References

Kilkenny Intermediate Hurling Championship
Kilkenny Intermediate Hurling Championship